The Wright Solar is a low entry single-decker bus body that was built on Scania L94UB and Scania K UB chassis by Wrightbus between 2000 and 2011. The Wright Solar Fusion is an articulated version.

Most of the buses are fitted with the same design as the Eclipse and the Pulsar. A common design is that it has a one-piece windscreen covering the destination display with an arched top together with the roof. All buses were built with two axles, however a tri-axle variant was offered.

In 2008, in co-operation with Translink, Wrightbus launched the Solar Rural on Scania K-series chassis, designed for use by Ulsterbus on rural bus services across Northern Ireland.

Of the 671 regular Solars produced, Translink purchased 198, Go North East purchased 80 and Trentbarton 64.

References

External links

Low-entry buses
Low-floor buses
Vehicles introduced in 2000
Solar